Clare Elizabeth Harris,  (born 1965) is a British anthropologist, art historian, and academic, specialising in South Asia and Tibet. She has been curator for Asian Collections at the Pitt Rivers Museum since 1998, and Professor of Visual Anthropology at the University of Oxford since 2014. She was elected a Fellow of the British Academy (FBA), the United Kingdom's national academy for the humanities and the social sciences, in July 2019.

References

British anthropologists
British women anthropologists
Visual anthropologists
British art historians
Women art historians
Fellows of the British Academy
Living people
1965 births

People associated with the Pitt Rivers Museum